Hasse Pavia Lind (born 10 June 1979) is an athlete from Denmark.  He competes in archery. Lind competed at the 2004 Summer Olympics in men's individual archery.  He won his first match, advancing to the round of 32.  In the second round of elimination, he was defeated.  His final rank was 19th overall.

References

1979 births
Living people
Danish male archers
Olympic archers of Denmark
Archers at the 2004 Summer Olympics
21st-century Danish people